Plaiter Reyes (16 December 1970 – 15 July 2017) was a Dominican Republic weightlifter. He competed in the men's super heavyweight event at the 2000 Summer Olympics.

References

1970 births
2017 deaths
Dominican Republic male weightlifters
Olympic weightlifters of the Dominican Republic
Weightlifters at the 2000 Summer Olympics
People from Barahona Province
Pan American Games medalists in weightlifting
Pan American Games bronze medalists for the Dominican Republic
Weightlifters at the 1999 Pan American Games
20th-century Dominican Republic people
21st-century Dominican Republic people